Paul Haakon (September 7, 1911 – August 16, 1992), born Paul Haakon Løngreen Nilson Panduoro, was a Danish ballerina and Broadway dancer.

Life and career

Early life 
Haakon was born on September 7, 1911, in Fredericia, Denmark. He studied ballet at the Royal Opera House in Copenhagen.

Career 
Haakon made his Broadway debut in 1933 in Champagne, Sec and continued to dance in numerous Broadway productions. He also performed in vaudeville acts at Radio City Music Hall alongside lead ballerina Patricia Bowman. In 1935, he briefly joined the American Ballet.

During World War II, Haakon toured with the United Service Organizations. He returned to the stage in the mid-forties, choreographing and dancing for Mexican Hayride and choreographing Spook Scandals. Expanding into television and film, Haakon also appeared on The Milton Berle Show, danced for the 1956 movie Around the World in 80 Days, and was the assistant dance director for the film So This Is Love.

Haakon joined the Jose Greco Spanish Ballet as a performer, eventually also serving as ballet master and production manager. Haakon and Greco developed a close friendship, and Haakon remained with the group until his retirement.

In 1970, Haakon retired from dance. In his later years, he worked as a salesman and a mail handler.

Death 
Haakon died of cancer in New York City on August 16, 1992. He is buried in Pohick Church Cemetery in Fairfax County, Virginia. In an obituary in The Washington Post, Haakon was described as "among the great male ballet dancers of the 20th century".

Filmography

Broadway

Film

References 

1911 births
1992 deaths
Danish male ballet dancers
20th-century Danish dancers
20th-century ballet dancers
Deaths from cancer in New York (state)
People from Fredericia
Danish emigrants to the United States
Burials at Pohick Church Cemetery